Adolf Ernst (October 6, 1832 – August 12, 1899) was a Prussian-born scientist. Ernst settled in Venezuela in 1861, where he taught at the Central University of Venezuela. He became the most important scientist in the country during the second half of the 19th century and was a key figure in the creation of the Museum of Natural Science and the National Library of Venezuela, where he also served as its director.

He developed important scientific works in this country. Also, as a university professor, he had a marked influence on generations of scientists from the second half of the nineteenth century in Venezuela.

He is regarded as the founder of the Venezuelan positivist school.

Biography 
His parents were Adolf Ernst and Catalina Bischoff. He studied high school in his hometown, and then enrolled at the University of Berlin where he studied natural sciences, pedagogy and modern languages. At this German institution, he met two children of the Venezuelan general Judas Tadeo Piñango, with whom he struck up a warm friendship, who encouraged him to travel to Venezuela. On December 2, 1861, he came to Venezuela from Hamburg. on August 5, 1864, he married Enriqueta Tresselt with whom he had five children.

In May 1867, now completely adapted to the Venezuelan life, he founded the Society of Physical and Natural Sciences of Caracas and later the National Museum in 1874. In 1876, he became the director of the National Library, in which he gave institution a big boost. During the government of Antonio Guzmán Blanco, he participated in the  international exhibitions organization in Vienna (1873), Bremen (1874), Santiago de Chile and Philadelphia (1876). In 1874, at the request of the President, he organized the chair of Natural History at the Central University of Venezuela, where he spread the Lamarck's and Charles Darwin's "natural selection" theories, which were fundamental in Zoology and Botany.

He was the inspiration and founder of positivism in Venezuela, and among his chief disciples were Lisandro Alvarado, José Gil Fortoul and Rafael Villavicencio. In 1889, the Central University of Venezuela awarded him the degree of Doctor of Philosophy, in recognition of his academic work. Ernst developed comprehensive research in botany, zoology and ethnography. He also did work in geography, geology, language, anthropology, Physics, paleontology and archeology.

Adolph Ernst carried out important studies in different regions of Venezuela, such as the Caracas valley, Lake Maracaibo, the Andes, the Venezuelan Guayana, the island of La Orchila, the Aroa copper mines and Betijoque diamond mines. He created the precursor of ethnobotany in Venezuela by developing themes such as Historia de la Yuca (1890) and El Banano (1893). The ethnographic and archaeological collections acquired by the National Museum formed the basis for publishing a series of descriptive anthropological works of diverse indigenous groups in the country: Wayuu, Ayamanes, Warao. In relation to his archaeological work, he emphasized work on the Andean region, which specifically described the lytic plaques also known as the "Batwing". He also provided ethnographic data on Andean Aboriginals and spent time with petroglyphs (1885-1889). One of Adolf Ernst's main merits was his disclosing Venezuelan material to the international scientific societies of the nineteenth century, and publishing their contributions in journals such as Globus, Zeitschrift für Ethnologie, American Anthropologist and in the Bulletin de la Société du Anthropologie Paris.

Works
 ERNST, A. 1875: “Catálogo  de la biblioteca de la Universidad de Caracas”. Imprenta de La Opinión Nacional. Caracas
 ERNST, A. 1876: “Enumeración sistemática de las especies de moluscos hallados hasta ahora en los alrededores de Caracas y demás partes de la República”. Apuntes Estadísticos del Distrito Federal. 77-85
 ERNST, A. 1884-1886: “La Exposición Nacional de Venezuela en 1883”. Imprenta de La Opinión Nacional. 2 volúmenes Caracas
 ERNST, A. 1986: “Obras completas”. Blas Bruni Celli, (Compilador). Presidencia de la República. 6 volúmenes. Caracas

References

IPNI 2563-1 Ernst
 BRUNI CELLI, Blas. 1962: “Adolfo Ernst”. En: Boletín de la Academia Nacional de la Historia. 180. Caracas
 CALZADILLA, Pedro Enrique. 2003: "La exposición nacional de 1883: balance simbólico y exhibición identitaria". Tierra Firme. 21(81):77-95. ISSN 0798-2968
 CARRILLO, José María. 1974: “Adolfo Ernst: semblanza biográfica”. Promoción ADOLFO ERNST. Caracas
 KEY AYALA, Santiago. 1955: “Adolfo Ernst, 1832-1899”. Fundación Eugenio Mendoza. Caracas
 RÖHL, Eduardo. 1949: “Fauna descriptiva de Venezuela”. Tipografía Americana. Caracas
 WAGNER, Erica. 1995: “Ernst, Adolfo”. En Diccionario Multimedia de Historia de Venezuela. Fundación Polar. Caracas
 YEPEZ COLMENARES, Germán. 2002: "Modernización, medicina, enfermedades y salud pública en la ciudad de Caracas (1870-77)"  História, Ciências, Saúde Manguinhos. 9 (supl):89-109

External links
 
 ADOLFO ERNST (1832-1899) 
 "La Yuca: Su patria, origen de su cultivo y beneficio" by Adolf Ernst
 The oldest museum in Venezuela

1832 births
1899 deaths
Academic staff of the Central University of Venezuela
People from the Province of Silesia
Botanists active in South America
Venezuelan biologists